Heaton Mersey is a suburb of Stockport, Greater Manchester, England. It is situated on the north-western border of Stockport, adjacent to Didsbury and Burnage in Manchester.

Heaton Mersey is a mostly residential area and commuter zone for Manchester. Heaton Mersey and its neighbouring areas (Heaton Norris, Heaton Chapel and Heaton Moor) are collectively known as the Four Heatons. Part of Heaton Mersey has been designated a conservation area.

Geography
Within the boundaries of the historic county of Lancashire, Heaton Mersey lies on the north bank of the River Mersey, just a few miles downstream from its source in Stockport town centre. The river acts as a boundary between Heaton Mersey and Cheadle Heath. Heaton Mersey is also bordered by East Didsbury to the west, Burnage to the north-west, Heaton Moor to the North/North-east and Heaton Norris to the east.

Heaton Mersey overlooks the Cheshire Plain, which can be clearly seen from the top part of Heaton Mersey park off Didsbury Road. At the bottom lies the valley of the River Mersey, where Heaton Mersey Bleachworks was situated (now demolished) as well as a business and industrial estate. Mersey Vale nature reserve and two ponds are also found here, one being a club-owned fishing pond. Just off Didsbury Road, opposite Heaton Mersey village, lies Heaton Mersey Bowl which is a large depression in the ground used as open green space.

Heaton Mersey Common, which is another local nature reserve with fields and woodland, is situated next to the former Cranford Golf range. It, too, contains a large pond.

Out of the four Heatons, Heaton Mersey has the most green space by area and is the only to be situated on a river or contain any substantial water body.

History 
The settlement of Heaton Mersey is rooted in the local industry which developed in the late eighteenth and nineteenth centuries. Prior to this, the area was agricultural, with small hamlets along the route between Stockport and Didsbury. 

Three of these hamlets, Grundy Hill, Top O’ Th’ Bank, and Parrs Fold eventually formed modern Heaton Mersey. 

The main industrial change for the Heaton Mersey area was the development of the Upper and Lower Bleachworks. The first works were built by the industrialist Samuel Oldknow, and his brother, on the north bank of the River Mersey in 1785. Oldknow’s influence had already been felt in other areas of Stockport, best-known for industrial and canal building activities in Marple and Mellor. 

Activities at the Bleachworks included the bleaching, dyeing and printing of cloth. The Lower works had a five-storey spinning mill and extensive weaving shed, in addition to the bleachcroft and reservoirs to the east of the site. The Upper works were built soon after the textile recession of 1793. The sites passed into the hands of several further owners after Oldknow. 

Some housing was built as a consequence of the industry, such as the Barracks Square dwellings, where many young apprentices inhabited. Much of the housing has however since been demolished. 

A number of villas were built beyond the main industrial village, and by the 1830s, Heaton Mersey was becoming a fashionable suburb among the industrial elite.  Local churches opened in the 1840s and 1850s, the population grew significantly between the 1850s and 1880s, and the railway line from Tiviot Dale in Stockport extended out to Heaton Mersey and beyond into other southern Manchester suburbs (see below).  

The railway station was demolished, as well as the Bleachworks themselves.

Transport 
The station was situated at the southern end of Station Road, which still exists. The extension to Station Road, connecting it to the western end of Craig Road so as to create access for residential development, runs parallel to the old track bed of the Midland line from Stockport Tiviot Dale.

Whilst nearly all of the original railway structure has long been removed, small sections of previous railway bridges remain. One structure exists where Vale road and Craig road meet and the former bridge section acts as a retaining wall. Two other sections can be seen either side of the River Mersey upstream of the weir and opposite the nearby farm.

From January 1889 until 4 May 1968, there was a steam locomotive running shed named Heaton Mersey, coded 9F. It lay on the north bank of the Mersey and was reached by a footbridge, still extant, leading from Gorsey Bank Road.

Transport in Heaton Mersey today generally consists of local buses operated by Stagecoach Manchester and First Greater Manchester along the main thoroughfare, the A5145 Didsbury Road. Local buses allow for connections to Metrolink at East Didsbury, National Rail at East Didsbury and Stockport, and local buses at Stockport bus station. Bus 323 runs between Stockport and Heaton Mersey. Road connections are available via the A5145 to the A34 at Parrs Wood, and the A6 at Stockport. The M60 is also accessible at Junctions 1, 2 and 3.

Education 
Schools include the primary schools: Tithe Barn, Didsbury Road, Mersey Vale and Saint Winifred's RC Primary School, famous for St Winifred's School Choir and chart hits in the 1980s, all rated Outstanding; other schools include Stella Maris School, an independent primary school, and St. John's Church of England, which are both rated Good. The local comprehensive is Priestnall School, formerly rated Outstanding, however dropping to a Requires Improvement in 2019.  Pre-schools are Freshfield (rated Good), Didsbury Road and Mersey Vale.

Community Facilities

The area has a Sea Scout base on Didsbury Road, with beaver scouts, cub scouts and sea scouts currently active. It also hosts regular Harvest farmer's markets, car boot sales and family fun days. The Moorfest music festival was held at the Heaton Mersey Bowl in 2005, which included appearances from Badly Drawn Boy and Howard Marks. Local attractions include the River Mersey, around which there is a nature park and trail. Heaton Mersey Common with its several pubs, delis, restaurants and shops supply the local amenities to the area. Heaton Mersey Park has a local fishing pond and further down station road is day-ticket fishing pond. Heaton Mersey is also home to the Heaton Mersey Lacrosse Team, who play in England's Northern Lacrosse division.

In Media
The Stockport-based band Blossoms used Heaton Mersey Bowl and the adjacent Vale Close to film sections of the music video for the song Honey Sweet.

See also

Listed buildings in Stockport

External links

Heaton Mersey Conservation Area
 Heaton Moor Council link

References

Areas of Stockport